Kulilay Amit (born 9 August 1972), better known by her stage name A-Mei, is a Taiwanese Puyuma singer and record producer. In 1996, she made her singing debut and released her album, Sisters. Her albums Truth (2001), Amit (2009), and Faces of Paranoia (2014) each won her a Golden Melody Award for Best Mandarin Female Singer and made the Taiwanese diva one of the singers who won the category the most times. Having sold over 50 million records, she has achieved success in the Mandarin-speaking world and is often referred to as the "Queen of Mandopop".

Life and career

1972–1996: Early years and career beginnings
A-Mei was born on 9 August 1972 in a Puyuma family in Beinan, Taitung, Taiwan. Her Puyuma-language name is Kulilay Amit, alternatively transliterated Gulilai Amit. In 1992, A-Mei moved to Taipei and took part in the Five Lights Star Singing Contest presented by the Taiwanese TV program Five Lights Awards; she made it all the way through to the finals but lost in the final round. In 1993, she attended the singing contest again and won. After that, she joined her cousin's band in 1995 and started to perform in pubs in Taipei. Her pub performance impressed Taiwanese music producer Chang Yu-sheng and Chang Hsiao-yen, the head of Taiwanese record label Forward Music at the time. In March 1996, she signed a recording deal with Forward Music.

1996–2000: Forward Music
After she signed a recording deal with Forward Music, she made a appearance on Chang Yu-sheng's album, Red Passion, which was released in July 1996, and she sang a duet titled Love Most Hurt Most. In December 1996, she released her debut studio album, Sisters. The title song featured her mother and sisters on background vocals. In June 1997, she released her second studio album, Bad Boy. The album earned her two Golden Melody Award nominations for Best Pop Vocal Album and Best Mandarin Female Singer. A-Mei embarked on her first solo concert tour which was in Taiwan, Hong Kong and Singapore in January 1998 and released a cover album in April 1998 that included many classic songs she planned to perform during the tour. In October 1998, she released her third studio album, Holding Hands, in which she collaborated with Taiwanese singer-songwriter David Tao. The album earned her a Golden Melody Award nomination for Best Mandarin Female Singer. Also in 1998, she won the Best Theme Song award at the Star Awards 1998 ceremony for her performance of the song "I don't mind", the opening theme song to the TV series Rising Expectations.

In June 1999, she released her fourth studio album, Can I Hug You, Lover?. The album earned her a Golden Melody Award nomination for Best Mandarin Female Singer. In July 1999, A-Mei embarked on her second concert tour, which visited Taiwan, mainland China, Hong Kong, Singapore and Malaysia. In April 2000, she released a live album titled Time to Say Goodbye, A-Mei Hong Kong Live. In May 2000, she sang the National Anthem of the Republic of China at the presidential inauguration ceremony of Chen Shui-bian, angering the government of the People's Republic of China which subsequently banned her from visiting mainland China for a few years. In December 2000, she released her fifth studio album, Regardless, the last studio album released by Forward Music. The album earned her a Golden Melody Award nomination for Best Mandarin Female Singer.

2001–2006: Warner Music
After she signed a recording deal with Warner Music Taiwan in June 2001, A-Mei released her sixth studio album, Truth, in October. The album earned her two Golden Melody Award nominations for Best Pop Vocal Album and Best Mandarin Female Singer and won Best Mandarin Female Singer. In September 2001, Forward Music released a compilation album, Journey, which includes all unreleased songs A-Mei recorded when she was signed under Forward Music. In August 2002, she released her seventh studio album, Fever. The album earned her two Golden Melody Award nominations for Best Pop Vocal Album and Best Mandarin Female Singer. In the same month, she embarked on her third concert tour, A-Class Entertainment World Tour, which visited Taiwan, mainland China, Hong Kong, Singapore, Malaysia, Australia and United States. In the same year, she won a MTV Asia Award for Favorite Artist Taiwan.

In June 2003, she released her eighth studio album, Brave. In September 2004, A-Mei released her ninth studio album, Maybe Tomorrow. The album earned her a Golden Melody Award nomination for Best Mandarin Female Singer. The music video of the song, Love Is the Only Way was nominated Best Music Video of the Year. In 2005, she decided to take a short break and headed to Boston for a three-month language study through Boston University's Center for English Language & Orientation Programs. In late 2005, she returned to the stage and performed a medley at the Golden Horse Awards Ceremony. In February 2006, she released her tenth studio album, I Want Happiness?. The album earned her a Golden Melody Award nomination for Best Mandarin Female Singer. In December 2006, she produced a musical, In Love with Carmen, which was performed twice at Taipei Arena.

2007–2014: EMI / Gold Typhoon
In April 2007, A-Mei signed a three-year recording deal with EMI Taiwan. In August 2007, she released her eleventh studio album, Star. The album earned her three Golden Melody Award nominations for Best Mandarin Album, Best Mandarin Female Singer, and Song of the Year for A Moment, which is a duet song with Taiwanese singer Jam Hsiao. In November 2007, she embarked on her fourth solo concert tour, Star Tour, which visited Taiwan, Mainland China, Hong Kong, Singapore, Malaysia, Japan, Canada and United States. In March 2008, she embarked on an opera tour, Turandot, in Japan.

In June 2009, A-Mei released her twelfth studio album, Amit. The album won four Golden Melody Awards for Best Mandarin Album, Best Mandarin Female Singer, Best Album Producer, and Song of the Year for Bold for My Love. The music video of Bold for My Love was nominated for Best Music Video of the Year. In November 2009, she embarked on her fifth concert tour, Amit First Tour, which visited Taiwan, Mainland China, Hong Kong, Macau, Japan, Singapore, and Malaysia. In April 2011, she released her thirteenth studio album, R U Watching?. The album earned her a Golden Melody Award nomination for Best Mandarin Female Singer. In September 2011, she embarked on her sixth concert tour, which visited Taiwan, mainland China, Hong Kong, Macau, Singapore, Malaysia, Australia, United Kingdom and United States. In July 2013, A-Mei became one of the judges of Chinese talent show, The Voice of China (season 2), along with Wang Feng, Na Ying, and Harlem Yu.

2014–present: EMI / Universal Music 
After Universal Music Group acquired EMI, it became one of Universal's record labels. In June 2014, A-Mei signed a recording deal with EMI Taiwan and was selected as the chief brand officer for the record label. In July 2014, she released her fourteenth studio album, Faces of Paranoia. The album won Golden Melody Award nominations for Best Mandarin Female Singer and Song of the Year with the song Faces of Paranoia and won Best Mandarin Female Singer. In April 2015, she embarked on her seventh concert tour, Utopia World Tour, which visited Taiwan, Mainland China, Hong Kong, Macau, Singapore, Malaysia, Japan, Thailand, New Zealand, Australia, Canada and the United States. In April 2015, she released her fifteenth studio album, Amit 2. The album earned her five Golden Melody Award nominations for Best Mandarin Album, Best Vocal recording Album, Best Mandarin Female Singer, Best Album Producer and Song of the Year with the song Matriarchy. In August 2015, she became one of the guest judges of the Chinese talent show The Voice of China (season 4). In October 2016, she appeared on the Chinese variety show Sound of My Dream. In December 2016, she embarked on the upgraded version of her seventh concert tour, Utopia 2.0 Carnival World Tour, as the celebration of the 20th anniversary of her singing career, which visited Taiwan, mainland China, Macau, Singapore, Malaysia, Spain, Italy, United Kingdom, Canada and the United States.

On January 15, 2017, 66,000 tickets for 6 concerts of Utopia 2.0 Carnival World Tour held in Kaohsiung Dome sold out in 8 minutes. The organizer announced the addition of 2 shows and 22,000 tickets, which sold out in 45 seconds, creating a new box office record and boosted the development of Kaohsiung's tourism industry. On the last day of her 20th anniversary of debut (December 12), she released her nineteenth studio album, Story Thief. On December 30, the final show of the Utopia World Tour was completed in Shanghai, setting a record among Chinese female singers and Taiwanese singers of 104 concerts during one tour.

On May 16, 2018, her album Story Thief earned six nominations and won Best Music Video for Left Behind, which was directed by Lo Ging-zim.

Discography
 Sisters (1996)
 Bad Boy (1997)
 Holding Hands (1998)
 Feeling (EP) (1999)
 Can I Hug You, Lover? (1999)
 Regardless (2000)
 Journey (2001)
 Truth (2001)
 Fever (2002)
 Brave (2003)
 Maybe Tomorrow (2004)
 I Want Happiness? (2006)
 Star (2007)
 Amit (2009)
 R U Watching? (2011)
 Faces of Paranoia (2014)
 Amit 2 (2015)
 Story Thief (2017)

Collaborations
 Shouldn't Be (with Jay Chou) from Jay Chou's Bedtime Stories (2016)

References

External links

 

1972 births
Living people
Taiwanese LGBT rights activists
Mezzo-sopranos
People from Taitung County
Puyuma people
Taiwanese Mandopop singers
20th-century Taiwanese women singers
21st-century Taiwanese women singers